East Sussex County Council is the local authority for the non-metropolitan county of East Sussex.

East Sussex is divided into five local government districts. Three are larger, rural, districts (from west to east: Lewes; Wealden; and Rother). The other two, Eastbourne and Hastings, are mainly urban areas. The rural districts are subdivided into civil parishes.

The County Council meets at East Sussex County Hall, the authority's headquarters; there are a number of other administrative buildings located throughout the county.

History 

Sussex was historically divided into six sub-divisions known as rapes. From the 12th century the three eastern rapes and the three western rapes had separate quarter sessions: the county town of the three eastern rapes was Lewes. This position was formalised by Parliament in 1865, and the two parts were made into administrative counties, each with distinct elected county councils, in 1889 under the Local Government Act 1888. Within East Sussex there were also three self-administered county boroughs: Brighton, Eastbourne and Hastings.

In 1974 East Sussex was made a non-metropolitan county, and the three county boroughs became districts within the county. At the same time the western boundary was altered, so that the Mid Sussex area (including Burgess Hill and Haywards Heath) was transferred to the county of West Sussex. In 1997, Brighton and Hove became a self-administered unitary authority; it was granted city status in 2000, whilst remaining part of the ceremonial county of East Sussex.

Elections 

In common with all shire counties, the whole of East Sussex County Council is elected every four years.  The first election to the reconstituted council took place in 1973, to prepare for the handover of services in April 1974.  The 1997 election was the first at which no representatives from Brighton and Hove were elected, as a result of that area acquiring a unitary council.  
The Conservative Party has always held the largest number of seats on the council, though among the existing divisions of the council (excluding wards from Brighton & Hove), in 1993 the Liberal Democrats won 23 of the 44 seats, which would on current boundaries have given them overall control.  Since the removal of Brighton and Hove, the Labour Party influence has been reduced although the party retains the majority of seats in Hastings.

An election was held in May 2013.  The UK Independence Party made gains here as elsewhere in the rural parts of England where elections were held.

There was a more recent election in 2021.

Notable members
Lord Rupert Nevill (1954–1967)

References

External links 
East Sussex County Council – Official website

 
County councils of England
1889 establishments in England
Local government in East Sussex
Local education authorities in England
Local authorities in East Sussex
Major precepting authorities in England
Leader and cabinet executives